Ihor Oleksandrovich Mitiukov (birth: September 27, 1952, Kyiv, Ukraine) is a Ukrainian diplomat. Ambassador Extraordinary and Plenipotentiary of Ukraine. Minister of Finance of Ukraine (1997-2001). Has been Head of Kyiv office and Managing Director of Morgan Stanley since March 2008.

Education
Ihor Mitiukov graduated from Taras Shevchenko National University of Kyiv in 1975, the cybernetics department; Institute of Economy, Academy of Sciences of Ukraine. (PhD).

Career
In 1990 - prior to that, he held various positions at Agrarian-Industrial Bank Ukraina, before being appointed as its Deputy Governor.

In 1994 - he was successively Deputy Governor of the National Bank of Ukraine and Vice-Prime Minister of Ukraine for banking and finance.

From 1995 to 1997 - as Ukraine's Special Representative to the European Union in Brussels, with Vice-Prime Ministerial status.

From 1997 to 2001 - he served as Minister of Finance of Ukraine.

From 2002 to 2005 - served as Ambassador Extraordinary and Plenipotentiary of Ukraine in the United Kingdom, also represented Ukraine in the International Maritime Organization.

Since June 14, 2007 - he has been an Independent Non-Executive Director at Ferrexpo Plc.

Since March 2008 - has been Head of Kyiv office and Managing Director of Morgan Stanley.

References

External links
 People of today
 Former Ambassadors of Ukraine to the United Kingdom
 Ihor Mitiukov Managing Director and Head of Kyiv Office, Morgan Stanley
 Ukrainian Ambassador to UK Igor Mityukov says Britain is ready to acknowledge Ukraine as market economy nation
 Mityukov: Ukraine hopes to unfreeze IMF loan in June

1952 births
Living people
Businesspeople from Kyiv
Ambassadors of Ukraine to the United Kingdom
Diplomats from Kyiv
Finance ministers of Ukraine
Ambassadors of Ukraine to the European Union
20th-century Ukrainian economists